Sites of Special Scientific Interest (SSSIs) in the United Kingdom are areas of conservation, consisting of protected areas, recognised for their biological or geological significance. In Northern Ireland an SSSI is called an area of special scientific interest (ASSI).

An Area of Search (AOS) is a geographical area used in the selection of these sites. In England these are largely based on the 1974–1996 administrative counties (with larger counties divided into two or more areas).  In Scotland they are largely based around the 1975 - 1996 districts, whereas in Wales they are based on districts (the second-tier administrative divisions which functioned between 1974 and 1996) or counties. The individual AOSs are between 400 km2 and 4,000 km2 in size. There are 59 AOSs in England, 12 in Wales, and 44 in Scotland.

Until the 2010s, Natural England, which maintains the database of English SSSIs, kept the listing of counties as it was in 1974, but by 2015 they had updated their lists to reflect some later changes. However, two counties abolished in 1996 are still used as areas of search by Natural England: Avon (which is now divided between Somerset, Gloucestershire and Bristol) and Cleveland (which is now divided into County Durham and North Yorkshire).

England

A number of sites are split between more than one county and will be included in this table more than once.

Northern Ireland

Scotland

Wales

References

Search for Designated Site Details by County - Natural England website

External links
 Natural England: English SSSIs
 Natural Resources Wales: Welsh SSSIs
 Scottish National Heritage: Scottish SSSIs
 Environment & Heritage Service for Northern Ireland: Areas of Special Scientific Interest

Lists of Sites of Special Scientific Interest
Conservation in the United Kingdom
Lists of protected areas of the United Kingdom